The Turpan water system or Turfan karez system  ) in Turpan, located in the Turpan Depression, Xinjiang, China, is a vertical tunnel system adapted by the Uyghur people. The word karez means "well" in the local Uyghur language. Turpan has the Turpan Karez Paradise  museum (a Protected Area of the People's Republic of China) dedicated to demonstrating its karez water system, as well as exhibiting other historical artifacts.
 
Turpan's karez well system was crucial in Turpan's development as an important oasis stopover on the ancient Silk Road skirting the barren and hostile Taklamakan Desert. Turpan  owes its prosperity to the water provided by its karez well system.

Description

Turpan's karez water system is made up of a horizontal series of vertically dug wells that are then linked by underground water canals to collect water from the watershed surface runoff from the base of the Tian Shan Mountains and the nearby Flaming Mountains. The canals channel the water to the surface, taking advantage of the current provided by the gravity of the downward slope of the Turpan Depression. The canals are mostly underground to reduce water evaporation and to make the slope long enough to reach far distances being only gravity fed.

The system has wells, dams and underground canals built to store the water and control the amount of water flow. Vertical wells are dug at various points to tap into the groundwater flowing down sloping land from the source, the mountain runoff. The water is then channeled through underground canals dug from the bottom of one well to the next well and then  to the desired destination. Turpan's karez irrigation system of special connected wells is believed to be of indigenous origin in China, perhaps combined with technology arriving from more western regions.

The local geography makes karez wells practical for agricultural irrigation and other uses. Water naturally flows down from the nearby mountains during the rainy season in an underground current to the low depression basin under the desert. The Turpan summer is very hot and dry with periods of wind and blowing sand.

Importance

Ample water was crucial to Turpan, so that the oasis city could service the many  caravans on the Silk Route resting there near a route  skirting the Taklamakan Desert. The caravans included merchant traders and missionaries with their armed escorts, animals including camels, sometimes numbering into the thousands, along with camel drivers, agents and other personnel, all of whom might stay for a week or more. The caravans needed pastures for their animals, resting facilities, trading bazaars for conducting business and replenishment of food and water.

Potential UNESCO World Heritage Site 
Karez wells in the Turfan area are on the UNESCO World Heritage Sites Tentative List for China.

Threatened by global warming
There are 20,000 glaciers in Xinjiang – nearly half of all the glaciers in China. The water from the glaciers via the underground channels has provided a stable water source year round, independent of season, for thousands of years. But since the 1950s, Xinjiang's glaciers have retreated by between 21 percent to 27 percent due to global warming, threatening the agricultural productivity of the region.

See also

References

External links

Satellite map showing deep basin from Google
Link to Silk Road map
Turpan – Ancient Stop on the Silk Road
Karez close to Turfan

 
Turpan
Water supply
Water wells
Chinese architectural history
Sites along the Silk Road
Major National Historical and Cultural Sites in Xinjiang
Irrigation projects
Irrigation in China